Jacques Ghislain Onana Ndzomo (born 23 August 1993) is a Cameroonian footballer who plays as a defender.

Career
Onana signed for Moldovan National Division club Petrocub Hîncești in 2017. He made his debut for the club on 30 April 2017 in a 1–0 loss against Dacia Chișinău. On 22 January 2021, he extended his contract with the club. He left the club when his contract expired at the end of 2021.

Honours
Petrocub Hîncești
Moldovan Cup: 2019–20

References

1993 births
Living people
Association football defenders
Cameroonian footballers
Cameroonian expatriate footballers
Expatriate footballers in Moldova
Cameroonian expatriate sportspeople in Moldova
CS Petrocub Hîncești players
Moldovan Super Liga players